Economy is an unincorporated community in Macon County, in the U.S. state of Missouri.

History 
Economy was originally called Vienna, and under the latter name settlement was made in the 1830s. The present name recalls the economical deals to be had at a local store. A post office called Vienna was established in 1854, the name was changed to Economy in 1856, and the post office closed in 1906.

References 

Unincorporated communities in Macon County, Missouri
Unincorporated communities in Missouri